Have Yourself a Soulful Little Christmas is an album of Christmas music by guitarist Kenny Burrell recorded in 1966 and released on the Cadet label.  It peaked at #15 on Billboard's Best Bets For Christmas album chart on December 7, 1968.

Reception

Allmusic awarded the album 4½ stars in a review by Michael G. Nastos that stated "With pensive, meditative, precise playing, it's a must-have and features a definitive jazz hit version of "Little Drummer Boy".

Track listing 
 "The Little Drummer Boy" (Katherine Davis, Henry Onorati, Harry Simeone) - 3:37
 "Have Yourself a Merry Little Christmas" (Ralph Blane, Hugh Martin) - 3:27
 "My Favorite Things" (Oscar Hammerstein II, Richard Rodgers) - 3:34
 "Away in a Manger" (Traditional) - 3:06
 "Mary's Little Boy Chile" (Jester Hairston) - 2:34
 "White Christmas" (Irving Berlin) - 3:10
 "God Rest Ye Merry Gentlemen" (Traditional) - 3:51
 "The Christmas Song" (Mel Tormé, Robert Wells) - 3:05
 "Children Go Where I Send Thee" (Traditional) - 3:08
 "Silent Night" (Franz Gruber, Joseph Mohr) - 2:41
 "The Twelve Days of Christmas" (Traditional) - 2:17
 "Merry Christmas Baby" (Lou Baxter, Johnny Moore) - 3:22

Personnel 
Kenny Burrell – guitar
Richard Evans – arrangement

References 

Kenny Burrell albums
1966 albums
Cadet Records albums
Albums produced by Esmond Edwards
1966 Christmas albums
Christmas albums by American artists
Jazz Christmas albums